Mike Quigley (born 2 October 1970) is an English former football midfielder.

After his playing career he was also assistant manager of for Leigh Genesis alongside Gary Flitcroft, appointed on 23 March 2009.  The pair later departed from the club, joining local rivals Chorley as the new management team. Whilst at the club he was arrested for a public order offence and was given a fixed penalty notice after an incident at a nightclub.

References

External links

Since 1888... The Searchable Premiership and Football League Player Database (subscription required)

1970 births
Living people
English footballers
Association football midfielders
Premier League players
Manchester City F.C. players
Wrexham A.F.C. players
Hull City A.F.C. players
Altrincham F.C. players
Northwich Victoria F.C. players
Bradford (Park Avenue) A.F.C. players
Chorley F.C. non-playing staff
Leigh Genesis F.C.